Gholaman (also Romanized as Gholāmān and Qolāmān) is a village in Gholaman Rural District, Raz and Jargalan District, Bojnord County, North Khorasan Province, Iran. At the 2006 census, its population was 2,665, in 690 families.

References 

Populated places in Bojnord County